Untoten is a German musical group based in Berlin. It was founded by David A. Line and female vocalist Greta Csatlós in 1994. The lyrics are written primarily in German and English, supported by female vocals.

History
Untoten released their first Demo CD Maultot in 1994. Eventually, they were signed to the music label Von Grafenwald.

Hab' kein Angst, Veluzifer, the band's debut album was released in 1996. Much of the lyrical content is inspired by vampire tales and the macabre.

In 1999, the band released their fourth full-length album Schwarze Messe. The music consists of classical and electronic influences. The band's album artwork is made by Greta Csatlós.

Their next album The Look of Blasphemie appeared in 2001.

In 2003, Untoten released their seventh full-length album Grabsteinland I  Durch den Kristallwald. "Mit Den Augen Der Nacht", "Cynthia", "Alexanderplatz", and "Willst Du? (Remix)" are among some notably popular tracks from Grabsteinland I Durch den Kristallwald.

The band released their next album Grabsteinland II Herrschaft der Vampire in 2004. Untoten have performed live shows in Germany to promote their record releases and continue to perform in music festivals with such notable artists as ASP, Emilie Autumn, Absurd Minds, Cinema Strange, Subway To Sally, Suicide Commando, Front 242, Front Line Assembly, Saltatio Mortis, Dreadful Shadows, and Funker Vogt.

In 2005, they released the third installment in the Grabsteinland trilogy Grabsteinland III Herz Der Finsternis.

Later in November 2006, Untoten presented their eleventh album Die Blutgräfin. This album is named after Hungarian Countess Elizabeth Bathory, who was dubbed Die Blutgräfin for killing young virgin girls for their blood.

David A. Line also start many side-projects: SOKO Friedhof, Engelwerk, Paloma im Blute, Candy's trash till death, Blood splattered bride and he produced project by other Soko Friedhof's member Demian Hildebrandt named Festival der Geisteskranken...

Out on November 5, 2007 is the newest Untoten album "Die Nonnen von Loudon". Untoten's David A. Line and singer/actress Greta Csatlos worked out 2 completely different album versions for this release, a rock and a barock version.

Line-up

Current members
 David A. Line – Male vocals, composition and lyrics
 Greta Csatlós – Female vocals and visual concept

Discography

Albums
 1996: Hab' keine Angst, Veluzifer
 1997: Kiss of Death
 1998: Nekropolis
 1999: Schwarze Messe
 2000: Vampire book
 2001: The look of blasphemie
 2003: Grabsteinland I Durch den Kristallwald
 2004: Grabsteinland II Herrschaft der Vampire
 2005: Grabsteinland III Herz der Finsternis
 2006: Die Blutgräfin
 2007: Die Nonnen von Loudun
 2008: Die Hexe
 2009: Grabsteinland IV Die schwarze Feder
 2010: Liebe oder Tod
 2010: Haus der Lüge
 2011: Zombie 1 - die Welt danach
 2011: Zombie 2 - the Revenge
 2012: Eisenherz
 2013: Zeitmaschine
 2014: Like A Lost Child
 2015: Grabsteinland V: Die Rückkehr

Other
 1994: In den Mund genommen, Poser (Demo)
 1995: Maultot (Demo)
 2000: Schwarzherzlichst (VHS)
 2002: Dresscode black II: Get into the goth club (Untoten vs SOKO Friedhof)
 2004: Raben (CDS)
 2007: Best Of
 2009: Akustisch: Des Raben Flug
 2012: How to become Undead (Rarities 1990–2000)

Exclusive tracks appearing on compilations
 ZilloScope: New Signs & Sounds 11/1998 – Doom (Gekürzte Version)
 Angels' Delight 2 – Black Blood
 Schattentanz I – Tanz Der Hexen
 Dresscode black I – Shake (Exclusive Track), Lilith, Sperm finger
 The Black Book Compilation – Goths Paradise IV – Abdomination
 Extreme Jenseithymnen 2 – Strange Inside
 Nachtschwärmer 6 – Mit Den Augen Der Nacht
 Orkus Compilation X – Alexanderplatz
 Nachtschwärmer 7 – Rabenlied
 Orkus Presents The Best of 2004 (Part 1) – Lichtbringer
 Sonic Seducer – 10 Jahre Jubiläums – Herz Der Finsternis (Edit)
 New Signs & Sounds 11/2006 (Zillo Compilation) – Die Jagd

References

External links
 Official Website
 Untoten - MusicBrainz

German heavy metal musical groups
German dark wave musical groups
German gothic rock groups
German grindcore musical groups